Courvoisier may refer to:

 Courvoisier, a brand of cognac
Courvoisier (surname)
 Courvoisier's law (or Courvoisier syndrome, or Courvoisier's sign), a medical diagnostic named after him
Courvoisier v. Raymond, a case decided by the Colorado Supreme Court
 Courvoisier, a historic manufacturer of complicated clocks and watches, controlled by Gallet & Co. during the 19th and early 20th century